The Great Divide is the first solo album by Scott Stapp, the former vocalist for Creed. It was released on November 22, 2005. The album came about after the original breakup of Creed and Stapp's collaboration on the original songs inspired by Mel Gibson's 2004 film The Passion of the Christ. There is a common conception that the lyrics seem to make references to the original breakup of Creed in 2004. The Great Divide was certified platinum on December 14, 2005. John Kurzweg, who produced all three of Creed's prior albums, also produced The Great Divide. The album received mixed reviews from critics.

Track listing

Personnel
Musicians
Scott Stapp – lead vocals, production
Aristides Rincon – lead guitar
John Curry – rhythm guitar
Mitch Burman – bass
Mark Archer – drums

Production
John Kurzweg – production, keyboards
Ron Saint Germain – production
John D. Thomas – co-producer
Pete de Boer – engineering

Charts

Weekly charts

Year-end charts

Singles

Certifications

Appearances
The songs "The Great Divide" and "You Will Soar" were featured as theme songs for the WWE Tribute to the Troops on December 11, 2006.
The song "You Will Soar" was remixed as "Marlins Will Soar" for the Miami Marlins, a National League baseball team, in 2010.

Interviews
Scott Stapp - The Great Divide (2006)

References

2005 debut albums
Scott Stapp albums
Wind-up Records albums